Alexander N. Cartwright is a US academic and President of the University of Central Florida in Orlando, Florida. Before his nomination to UCF, he was the chancellor of the University of Missouri in Columbia, Missouri, and Provost and Executive Vice Chancellor of the State University of New York. On March 20, 2020, Cartwright was nominated by a unanimous vote of the UCF Board of Trustees to become President-Elect of UCF, and was then confirmed by the Florida Board of Governors on March 25, 2020. He became the acting President of UCF on April 13, 2020, succeeding Interim President Thad Seymour.

References 

Leaders of the University of Missouri
People from Columbia, Missouri
Year of birth missing (living people)
Living people